The Ministry of Finance of the People's Republic of China is the cabinet-level executive department of the State Council of China which administers macroeconomic policies and the annual budget. It also handles fiscal policy, economic regulations and government expenditure for the state.

The ministry also records and  publishes annual macroeconomic data on China's economy.  This includes information such as previous economic growth rates in China, central government debt and borrowing and many other indicators regarding the economy of Mainland China.

The Ministry of Finance's remit is smaller than its counterparts in many other states. Macroeconomic management is primarily handled by the National Development and Reform Commission (NDRC). State-owned industries are the responsibility of the  State-owned Assets Supervision and Administration Commission, and there are separate regulators for banking, insurance and securities. It also does not handle regulation of the money markets or interest rates. These, together with other aspects of monetary policy, are governed by the People's Bank of China (PBC), Mainland China's central bank. The Ministry, NDRC and PBC are equal in status, with their political heads all sitting on the State Council.

Role 
The main functions of the Ministry of Finance is to carry out the following duties of the state:

Organizational structure 
Organizational structure obtained from the Ministry of Finance website:

General Office
Policy & Programme Department
Legal Department
Tax Policy Department
Tariff Policy Department
Budget Department
Treasury Department
National Defense Department
Administrative & Law Enforcement Department
Education, Science & Culture Department
Economic Construction Department
Agriculture Department
Social Security Department
State Equity & Corporate Finance Department
Finance Department
International Department 
Accounting Regulatory Department
Supervision Department
State Rural Development Office
Personnel & Education Department

Leadership 
All of the leaders are members of the Ministry's Communist Party Committee, with Liu Kun as its secretary.

List of Finance Ministers

As shareholder
The MOF also acted as the controlling shareholder for a number of financial service companies of China, such as People's Insurance Company of China, China Life Insurance Group (parent of China Life), China Taiping Insurance Group (parent of China Taiping Insurance Holdings), etc. The Ministry also owned Industrial and Commercial Bank of China, the Agricultural Bank of China, the Bank of Communications, China Great Wall Asset Management, China Cinda Asset Management , China Orient Asset Management, China Huarong Asset Management and China Re, etc.

MOF also owned China Railway, China Tobacco and CITIC Group.

See also 
Chinese financial system
Taxation in China
People's Bank of China
Ministries of the People's Republic of China

References

External links 
 Official website 

 
Finance in China
Finance
China
Ministries established in 1949
Government finances in China